Christian Mougang Bassogog (born 18 October 1995) is a Cameroonian professional footballer who plays for Chinese Super League club Shanghai Shenhua and the Cameroon national team as a winger or forward.

Club career

Rainbow FC
Bassogog began his career in his native Cameroon at second division side Rainbow FC, graduating from the youth system.

Wilmington Hammerheads
On 29 April 2015, Bassogog joined the United Soccer League club Wilmington Hammerheads, in the United States. Christian played 16 games and made two assists for the American club before he moved to the Danish club AaB. On 28 August, he signed a four-year contract with his new club.

AaB
On 29 September 2015, Bassogog got his debut for his new club AaB in the Danish Cup against the Aarhus-located team Lystrup IF. He came on the pitch in the second half with a half hour left.

On 11 February 2016, in the Danish Superliga winter break, Bassogog was chosen to play the forward-position in a friendly match against Sioni Bolnisi from Georgia. He scored two goals in the match, and former head coach Lars Søndergaard talked afterwards about, that Bassogog in the future could be used on the forward-position instead of the wing.

On 29 February 2016, he got his debut in the Danish Superliga against FC Midtjylland. He came on the pitch with 10 minutes left.

Following a string of impressive performances for Cameroon at the 2017 Africa Cup of Nations, AaB sporting director Allan Gaarde commented that Bassogog was the subject of multiple queries regarding potential moves away from AaB in the 2017 January transfer window.

Henan Jianye
On 19 February 2017, AaB officially announced the departure of Bassogog for a reported fee of 45 million Danish kroner (approx. £5 million) to join the Chinese side Henan Jianye FC. This was a recording-breaking transfer fee for AaB, surpassing that of Jesper Grønkjær when he signed for the Dutch club Ajax Amsterdam for £3.5 million in October 1997.

On 31 July 2020, Bassogog tested positive for COVID-19 in Guangzhou.

Shanghai Shenhua
On 26 February 2021, Bassogog signed with Chinese Super League side Shanghai Shenhua.

International career

Christian Bassogog had a stellar Africa Cup of Nations 2018, scoring once en route to their victory, and was named as the Best Player at AFCON 2017. On November 11, 2022, Bassogog was selected for the 2022 FIFA World Cup. On November 27, 2022, Bassogog received a yellow card from the referee who deemed his celebration for a goal too excessive. He was not on the field that time.

Career statistics

Club

International

 
Scores and results list Cameroon's goal tally first, score column indicates score after each Bassogog goal.

Honours
Cameroon
 Africa Cup of Nations: 2017, third place: 2021

Individual
 Best player of the Africa Cup of Nations: 2017
 CAF Team of the Tournament: 2017

References

External links
 
 

1995 births
Living people
Cameroonian footballers
Cameroonian expatriate footballers
Wilmington Hammerheads FC players
USL Championship players
AaB Fodbold players
Henan Songshan Longmen F.C. players
Shanghai Shenhua F.C. players
Danish Superliga players
Chinese Super League players
Association football midfielders
Expatriate soccer players in the United States
Expatriate men's footballers in Denmark
Expatriate footballers in China
Cameroonian expatriate sportspeople in China
Cameroon international footballers
2017 Africa Cup of Nations players
2017 FIFA Confederations Cup players
2019 Africa Cup of Nations players
2021 Africa Cup of Nations players
2022 FIFA World Cup players
Africa Cup of Nations-winning players
Footballers from Douala